Weißenfels was a district (Kreis) in the south of Saxony-Anhalt, Germany. Neighboring districts were (from south clockwise) Burgenlandkreis, Merseburg-Querfurt and the Saxon district Leipziger Land.

History 
Near the small town Goseck archaeologists, discovered in 1999 was the oldest solar observatory in Europe, beating Stonehenge by more than 2000 years. Around 5000 BC the circular trench with a diameter of 75 meters was surrounded with wood palisades, with three openings which allowed to measure the date of the spring and autumn equinox. Excavations on the site are planned to continue until 2007.

The district in today's borders was created in 1994 when the two previous districts Weissenfels and Hohenmölsen were merged.

Geography 
The main river in the district is the Saale with viticulture along the river valley. In the east of the district is the lignite open pit mining area of Hohenmölsen.

Coat of arms

Towns and municipalities

External links 
Official website (German)

Districts of Prussia